Wang Wanqiang (born 15 November 1964) is a Chinese former cyclist. He competed in the team time trial event at the 1984 Summer Olympics.

References

External links
 

1964 births
Living people
Chinese male cyclists
Olympic cyclists of China
Cyclists at the 1984 Summer Olympics
Place of birth missing (living people)